Slađana Pop-Lazić (born 26 July 1988) is a Serbian handball player for Brest Bretagne Handball. She played for the Serbian national team.

Individual awards
French Championship Best Pivot: 2016

References

External links

1988 births
Living people
Serbian female handball players
Handball players from Belgrade
Expatriate handball players
Serbian expatriate sportspeople in France
Mediterranean Games competitors for Serbia
Competitors at the 2009 Mediterranean Games
21st-century Serbian women